David (Dave) H. Garrison is the host of the Faith & Liberty Talk Show, an American businessman, lawyer, and former Republican candidate for Congress from Texas.  Garrison received national attention for his 2012 bid for United States Congress in the 25th district of Texas.

Education 
Garrison earned his Bachelor of Arts from the University of Pittsburgh at Johnstown Pre-Law (Political Science & History double major) in 1988.  He earned his Doctor of Jurisprudence degree from South Texas College of Law in 1997.

He has been licensed to practice law in the State of Texas since 1997.

Business career
Garrison was a senior executive with several companies including Halliburton Corporation and Brown & Root Inc.  At Halliburton he worked for several years under former Vice President Dick Cheney who was Halliburton's CEO. Garrison was directly responsible for many of Halliburton's international operations in more than fifty-six countries with 4500 subordinates. He also, has over thirty-eight years of business experience primarily as a senior executive with Fortune 100 companies such as USAA Inc., In January 2008, Dave retired as the Executive Vice President of Corporate Services for USAA Inc. where he had responsibility for many aspects of corporate operations.
Dave is also the author of over 100 newspaper columns published in the Washington Examiner, Gannett Newspapers, and The Circleville Herald

Political career

Garrison ran for U.S. Congress in 2012 (TX-R CD25) where he was one of the leading candidates in a field of twelve candidates. Dave received the only A+ rating from Heritage Alliance and the Texas Eagle Forum. Further, Dave received the highest ratings possible from the National Right to Life (NRLC) and the National Rifle Association (NRA).

He came in fourth in the Republican primary on May 29, 2012, with slightly less than 12% of the vote, being beaten by Wes Riddle and Roger Williams, who advanced to the run-off; Williams was elected in November 2012.

Collegiate Teaching Career 
Garrison teaches in the Ohio Christian University Business program, where he created new majors, conducted a regular Rome, Italy study abroad program, added a Business plan competition and developed a Business Advisory Council. He was named as the “Faculty of the Year” for 2010/2011 for Ohio Christian University.

He is the Dean of the School of Business & Government Department for Ohio Christian University.  He is also the founder, producer, and host for the Faith & Liberty Talk Show (a podcast), a production of the Ohio Christian University Business & Government Department. The Faith & Liberty Talk Show premiered on January 18, 2013. During the show, he interviews many different nationally known authorities who have had significant accomplishments in politics, literature, business, economics, religion, and many other areas relevant to Christians engaging the political and civil arena.

References 

 United States House of Representatives elections in Texas, 2012

External links 
 Ohio Christian University
 Faith & Liberty Talk Show

1951 births
Living people
American lawyers
People from Texas